Oleg Bakhmatyuk (Ukrainian: Олег Бахматюк, born August 14, 1974) is a Ukrainian entrepreneur, former billionaire, and politician. He is the owner of the agricultural vertical integrated company UkrLandFarming, and one of the largest egg producers in both Europe and Asia.

Early life and education
Bakhmatyuk was born on August 14, 1974, in Ivano-Frankivsk, Ukrainian SSR (now Ukraine). In 1996, he graduated from the Chernivtsi Economics and Law Institute, where he specialized in management of the production sphere.

In 2005, he graduated from the Ivano-Frankivsk National Technical University of Oil and Gas, with specialist diplomas in management and engineering physics.

Career
Between 1996 and 2001, he was the Administrator and Desk Officer, the Manager, the Deputy Head of the Supply Division Department, and the Head of the Commercial Department at KGD as a representative of Itera in the Ivano-Frankivsk Region. In 2001, he founded the Precarpathian Finance Corporation.

Since 2002, he has been a Deputy of Ivano-Frankivsk City Council, a member of the Economic Revival Faction, and a member of the City Council Committee on issues of finance planning, prices and budget. In 2002, he also held the position of the Deputy of the President of KGD company Ostap Darmogray. Later in 2002, he left KGD and lead the Precarpathian Finance Corporation.

During 2002–2004, Bakhmatyuk was a business partner of Ihor Yeremeyev in oil, agrarian business, and region gasification. In 2003, he founded Stanislavska Torgova Kompaniya (Stanislavskiy Trade Company), which became an owner of the largest chain of grocery stores in the Ivano-Frankivsk Region (under the brand Favorit). The company was sold in 2010 to pay off debts to the competitor company Pakko-Holding.

In 2004, Bakhmatyuk founded the commercial bank Financial Initiative. In 2005, he was appointed as the Head of the Office of Investments Expert Estimation and Corporate Financing at the national stock company NSC Naftogaz of Ukraine. He was later appointed as the Advisor to the Head of Naftogaz. On July 25, 2006, he was appointed as the Deputy Chairman of the Board at Naftogaz.

In 2006, he bought a controlling stake in region gas distribution companies IvanoFrankivskGas, LvivGas, ZKGas, ChernivtsiGas and VolynGas. He later sold his controlling stake to the RosUkrEnergo AG company, owned by Dmytro Firtash, in 2007.

On January 17, 2007, Bakhmatyuk was dismissed from his held position at Naftogaz, as well as from the public service. Since 2011, he joined the founders of VAB Bank. In October 2014 the National Bank of Ukraine provided a ₴1.2 billion stabilization loan to VAB Bank. In November 2014 they declared the bank insolvent and introduced a temporary administration. As a result of the economic and banking crisis in Ukraine in 2014–2015, the bank, like 99 other Ukrainian banks (out of 180 as of 2013), was withdrawn from the market by a decision of the National Bank of Ukraine. In November 2019, Bakhmatyuk was put on the national wanted list on suspicions of embezzling nearly $50 million before VAB Bank's license was revoked in 2015. He is the only one of their ex-owners of liquidated banks who proposed to cover the bank's debts to the Deposit Guarantee Fund and the NBU.

Bakhmatyuk is currently residing outside Ukraine. According to an investigation by Al Jazeera he bought Cypriot citizenship somewhere between 2017 and 2019. In September 2020 the National Anti-Corruption Bureau of Ukraine asked the Office of the Prosecutor General of Ukraine to ask for the extradition of Bakhmatyuk from Austria.

Agricultural business
In 2003, Bakhmatyuk bought the Avangard poultry factory and created a company with the same name. Since 2007, he has led the Board of Management at Avangard Agro Holding. The company holds a 33% share of the Ukrainian egg market. On April 29, 2010, the Ukrainian agricultural holding Avangard (SPV-company Avangardco Investments Public Limited) raised $187.5 million for 20% of the share capital during the initial public offering on the London Stock Exchange.

In 2010, Bakhmatyuk bought the assets of the United States chicken processing company Townsends Inc., with the idea to restore the work of the poultry processing plant and establish a USA meat supply to Ukraine and Russia. This, however, proved unsuccessful.

In 2011, Bakhmatyuk founded UkrLandFarming, a major vertically integrated agricultural holding of Ukraine (as a result of an assets merger with Avangard), which is the largest agricultural lands lessee, producing grain and breeding cattle. In 2011, he bought the companies Dakor Agro Holding and Rise, contributing to the magnitude of UrkLandFarming. In 2013, he bought the agricultural holding Valinor.

During 2014–2015, Bakhmatyuk and his companies suffered great losses due to the Russian Federation aggression including the annexation of Crimea and the hybrid war in the Donetsk and Luhansk Oblasts of Ukraine, where the company owned significant capital. As a result, the total debt has increased. In April, 2016, he re-headed the Board of Directors of Avangard Agro Holding.

Recognition
Bakhmatyuk won the 2009 award in the national program Person of the Year, for the Agrarian of the Year category.

Family
Bakhmatyuk is married and has three daughters and one son.

His sister, Nataliya Vasilyuk, is the Head of Avangard Agro Holding and was recognized as the best business-woman of Ukraine's agricultural sector in 2019.

References  

Living people
Politicians from Ivano-Frankivsk
1974 births
21st-century Ukrainian businesspeople
Fugitives wanted by Ukraine